Zabiele  is a village in the administrative district of Gmina Niedźwiada, within Lubartów County, Lublin Voivodeship, in eastern Poland.

References

Villages in Lubartów County